Han Tae-song is a diplomat from the Democratic People's Republic of Korea (North Korea) who currently serves as its ambassador to the United Nations in Geneva.

As a career diplomat, he has served as North Korea's top envoy to Italy, Malta, Greece and Spain. In 1992, while serving in Zimbabwe, he was expelled from the country after being caught engaging in the illicit trafficking of rhino horns.

In 2017 he was appointed ambassador to Switzerland. In September of the same year, he made a direct threat on behalf of his country to the United States of America.

References

Permanent Representatives of North Korea to the United Nations
Ambassadors of North Korea to Switzerland
Ambassadors of North Korea to Malta
Ambassadors of North Korea to Italy
Anti-Americanism
Living people
Ambassadors of North Korea to Spain
Ambassadors of North Korea to Greece
Year of birth missing (living people)